The Town of Huntington is one of ten towns in Suffolk County, New York. Founded in 1653, it is located on the north shore of Long Island in northwestern Suffolk County, with Long Island Sound to its north and Nassau County adjacent to the west. Huntington is part of the New York metropolitan area. As of the 2020 census, the town population was 204,127.

History

In 1653, three men from Oyster Bay, Richard Holbrook, Robert Williams and Daniel Whitehead, purchased a parcel of land from the Matinecock tribe. This parcel has since come to be known as the "First Purchase" and included land bordered by Cold Spring Harbor on the west, Northport Harbor on the east, what is now known as Old Country Road to the south and Long Island Sound to the north. The three men immediately turned the land over to the settlers who had already been living there.

The origin of the name is unknown but the consensus among historians is it was named for the birthplace of Oliver Cromwell who was Lord Protector of England at the time of the town's establishment. 
From that initial settlement, Huntington grew over subsequent years to include all of the land presently comprising the modern Towns of Huntington and Babylon. The southern part of the town was formally separated to create Babylon in 1872.

Because Huntington was populated largely by English settlers, unlike the rest of the New Amsterdam colony, the town voted in 1660 to become part of the Connecticut colony rather than remain under the authority of New Amsterdam. It was not until the British gained control of New Amsterdam in 1664 (renaming it New York) that Huntington was formally restored to the jurisdiction of New York.

Following the Battle of Long Island during the American Revolutionary War, British troops used Huntington as their headquarters, and remained encamped there until the end of the war.

The arrival of the Long Island Rail Road in 1867 transformed the economy of Huntington from primarily agriculture and shipping (based on its well protected harbor) to tourism and commuting. Cold Spring Harbor became a popular summer resort.

The end of World War II brought about an explosive growth of population in Huntington, as in the rest of the region. Farms and resorts gave way to homes, and Huntington has transformed into a major bedroom community for nearby New York City.

Demographics

As of the census of 2000, there were 195,289 people, 65,917 households, and 52,338 families residing in the town. The population density was 2,078.4 people per square mile (802.5/km2). There were 67,708 housing units at an average density of 720.6 per square mile (278.2/km2). The racial makeup of the town in 2000 was 88.31% White, 4.22% Black or African American, 0.13% Native American, 3.50% Asian, 0.02% Pacific Islander, 2.27% from other races, and 1.55% from two or more races. Hispanic or Latino of any race were 6.58% of the population. As of the census of 2010, the racial makeup of the town was 84.15% White, 4.68% Black or African American, 0.20% Native American, 4.96% Asian, 0.02% Pacific Islander, 3.89% from other races, and 2.10% from two or more races. Hispanic or Latino of any race were 11.00% of the population.

There were 65,917 households, out of which 37.1% had children under the age of 18 living with them, 67.4% were married couples living together, 8.9% had a female householder with no husband present, and 20.6% were non-families. 16.2% of all households were made up of individuals, and 6.7% had someone living alone who was 65 years of age or older. The average household size was 2.91 and the average family size was 3.26.

In the town, the population was spread out, with 25.5% under the age of 18, 5.8% from 18 to 24, 30.2% from 25 to 44, 25.5% from 45 to 64, and 13.1% who were 65 years of age or older. The median age was 39 years. For every 100 females, there were 96.2 males. For every 100 females age 18 and over, there were 93.4 males.

According to a 2007 estimate, the median income for a household in the town was $102,865, and the median income for a family was $113,119. Males had a median income of $61,748 versus $40,825 for females. The per capita income for the town was $36,390. About 2.9% of families and 4.6% of the population were below the poverty line, including 5.1% of those under age 18 and 4.6% of those age 65 or over.

Government and politics

The town government consists of a town council with four members, all of whom are elected at large. The town supervisor is elected by the entire town. Other elected positions are the Town Clerk, Highway Superintendent, and Receiver of Taxes. A referendum to move to a ward district system on December 22, 2009, failed 81% to 18%.

Economy
Sbarro's headquarters were located in Melville in the Town of Huntington until 2015.

Around 2002, Swiss International Air Lines's North American headquarters moved from Melville to Uniondale, Town of Hempstead. The facility, the former Swissair North American headquarter site, was completed in 1995. Swissair intended to own, instead of lease, its headquarters site. It enlisted architect Richard Meier to design the Melville facility.

In 1997, Aer Lingus announced that it was moving its North American headquarters from Manhattan to Melville; James Lyndon, a spokesperson for the airline, said that the company moved to Long Island in an effort to reduce costs, as leasing costs are lower on Long Island than in Manhattan. The move would transfer 75 employees, including administrative personnel, marketing personnel, sales personnel, and telephone reservation agents. The airline planned to move on June 15, 1997. The airline had also considered sites in Boston and in Westchester, New York.

Top employers
According to Huntington's 2016 Comprehensive Annual Financial Report, the top employers in the town are:

Education

Colleges and universities
Huntington is home to two institutions of higher education, including:
 Five Towns College in Dix Hills
 Seminary of the Immaculate Conception

Elementary and high schools

 Cold Spring Harbor Central School District
 Cold Spring Harbor Jr./Sr. High School
Goosehill Primary School
Lloyd Harbor School
Westside School

 Commack School District
 Commack High School
 Commack Middle School
 Burr Intermediate School
 Sawmill Intermediate School
 Rolling Hills Primary School
 North Ridge Primary School
 Note: Some schools in the Commack School District are located in the Town of Smithtown.

 Elwood Union Free School District
 John Glenn High School 
 Elwood Middle School 
 James H. Boyd Intermediate School 
 Harley Avenue Primary School 

 Half Hollow Hills Central School District
Half Hollow Hills High School East
Half Hollow Hills High School West
West Hollow Middle School
Candlewood Middle School
Otsego Elementary School
Paumanok Elementary School
Signal Hill Elementary School
Sunquam Elementary School
Vanderbilt Elementary School

 Harborfields Central School District
 Harborfields High School
 Oldfield Middle School
 Thomas J. Lahey Elementary School
 Washington Drive Primary School

 Huntington Union Free School District
 Huntington High School
 J. Taylor Finley Middle School
 Woodhull Intermediate School
 Jack Abrams Intermediate School
 Flower Hill Primary School
 Jefferson Primary School
 Southdown Primary School
 Washington Primary School

 Northport-East Northport Union Free School District
 Northport High School
 East Northport Middle School
 Northport Middle School
 5th Avenue Elementary School
 Pulaski Rd Elementary School
 Bellerose Elementary School
 Dickinson Elementary School
 Norwood Elementary School
 Ocean Ave Elementary School

 South Huntington Union Free School District
 Walt Whitman High School
 Henry L. Stimson Middle School (with 6th grade at Silas Wood Center)
 Birchwood Intermediate School
 Maplewood Intermediate School
 Countrywood Primary School
 Oakwood Primary School

 Private schools
 St. Patrick's School
 St. Anthony's High School
 Upper Room Christian School

Local media
Several weekly newspapers cover local news exclusively, including The Long-Islander, since 1838 as well as The Times of Huntington by TBR News Media. The Village Connection Magazine, published by Jim Savalli, is a lifestyle and entertainment magazine dedicated to the town of Huntington. Additionally, Patch, an online-only news website formerly owned by AOL; HuntingtonNow.com, a digital news site owned by a local resident and published since 2018; and the Huntington Buzz, an online-only news website that is independently owned; cover hyper-local news on issues, people and events in Huntington.

In popular culture

Huntington is the setting of the long-running comic strip The Lockhorns.
Huntington is the basis for the television series The Wonder Years.
Huntington is the town in which the American sitcom Growing Pains supposedly takes place. However, Robin Hood Lane, the street address of the Seaver family's home, is fictional. The show's creator, Neal Marlens, grew up in Huntington.
The Village of Northport was mentioned in episode 6 of the 2012 NBC drama series Smash.

Notable people

Communities and locations

Villages (incorporated)
 Asharoken
 Huntington Bay
 Lloyd Harbor
 Northport

Hamlets (unincorporated)

 Centerport
 Cold Spring Harbor
 Commack (partly, with the Town of Smithtown)
 Dix Hills
 East Northport
 Eatons Neck
 Elwood
 Fort Salonga (partly, with the Town of Smithtown)
 Greenlawn
 Halesite
 Huntington
 Huntington Station
 Melville
 South Huntington
 Vernon Valley
 West Hills
 Wincoma

Transportation

Railroad lines
The Long Island Rail Road's Port Jefferson Branch serves the town's vicinity, and uses stations between Cold Spring Harbor through Northport. Huntington is the eastern terminus of electrification along the Port Jefferson Branch.

Bus service
The Town of Huntington is served primarily by Huntington Area Rapid Transit bus routes, though some routes from Suffolk County Transit also serve the town.

Major roads

 Interstate 495 is the Long Island Expressway, and the sole interstate highway in the Town of Huntington, with interchanges from part of Exit 48 in West Hills on the Nassau-Suffolk County Line to Exit 52 in Commack.
 Northern State Parkway was the sole limited-access highway in the Town of Huntington until the construction of the Long Island Expressway. It has interchanges from Exit 39 in West Hills east of the Nassau-Suffolk County Line to Exit 43 in Commack on the Huntington-Smithtown Town Line.
 New York State Route 25A, the northernmost west–east state highway on Long Island including the Town of Huntington. It enters the town from Laurel Hollow in Nassau County, running through historic Cold Spring Harbor, then downtown Huntington, later Centerport, Northport, and Fort Salonga where it crosses the Huntington-Smithtown Town Line.
 New York State Route 25, the parent route of NY 25A, which also runs west to east along Jericho Turnpike. It enters the town at West Hills from Woodbury, passes through South Huntington, Elwood, and Commack, where it crosses the Huntington-Smithtown Town Line.
Old Country Road, an extension of a principal west–east thoroughfare in Central Nassau County. It enters Suffolk County in a hidden overlap with Round Swamp Road at Exit 48 on I-495, then branches off to the northeast as it passes through West Hills, Melville, Dix Hills and South Huntington. Unlike in Nassau County, the road has no designation.
 New York State Route 108, is the westernmost south–north state route in Suffolk County. It runs from Suffolk CR 11 at Cold Spring Harbor's LIRR station to NY 25A running along the edge of the Nassau County Line.
 New York State Route 110, is a major south–north highway in Suffolk County. It enters the town from East Farmingdale near the State University of New York at Farmingdale, and runs through Melville, then South Huntington, Huntington Station, Downtown Huntington, and serves as the main road in Halesite, before finally terminating at Youngs Hill Road, where it becomes the undesignated East Shore Road.
 New York State Route 231, has been entirely a four-lane divided highway throughout its existence. It enters the town from Deer Park in the Town of Babylon between Rutland and Kenmore Streets and runs through Dix Hills, where it has interchanges with I-495 and the Northern State Parkway. Immediately after the parkway, the route terminates at a fork in the road for Suffolk CRs 35 to the northwest and 66 to the northeast.
 County Route 2 is Straight Path, a southwest to northeast county road running from the Babylon Town Line through Wyandanch as the main road, ending at NY 231 in Dix Hills. 
 County Route 3 is a south to north county route known as Wellwood Avenue from north of East Farmingdale at the Babylon Town Line to Ruland Road (CR 5) where it becomes Pinelawn Road until it reaches NY 110 in Melville.
 County Route 11, includes Woodbury Road in Cold Spring Harbor, and Pulaski Road from Cold Spring Harbor through Fort Salonga.
 County Route 35
 County Route 67 includes the remaining drivable portion of the Long Island Motor Parkway.
 County Route 92 is the south-to-north route from Oakwood Road from NY 25 in West Hills, Huntington Manor, and Huntington, then turns east onto High Street to end at NY 110.

Self-serve gas 
Huntington is the only township in the United States to ban self-service gas stations at the township level and among the few places in the U.S. where full-service gas stations are compulsory and no self-service is allowed; the entire state of New Jersey and the western-Mid Valley portion of Oregon are the only other places in the country with similar laws.

See also
1946 Town of Huntington planning map from Wikimedia Commons
National Register of Historic Places listings in Huntington, New York
Heckscher Museum of Art
Huntington Family
Kelsey Outrage

References

Further reading

External links

 
 Huntington Historical Society
 

 
Towns on Long Island
Towns in Suffolk County, New York
Towns in the New York metropolitan area
Populated coastal places in New York (state)